Christina Murillo Ruiz (born 28 January 1993) is an American-born Mexican former footballer who played as a centre back for the Mexico women's national team.

College career
Murillo was a four-year starter at the University of Michigan where she played as a midfielder and center back. She did not play in 2014, instead choosing to train full-time with the Mexican Women's National Team ahead of the 2015 FIFA Women's World Cup. Her Senior season she was named team captain and made the All-Big Ten First team. She made 82 appearances and scored 2 goals for the Wolverines. She recorded a team high seven assists her senior year. Additionally, she is tied with a program record for most assists in a single game. <ref>{{Cite web |url=http://www.mgoblue.com/sports/w-soccer/mtt/christina_murillo_763804.html |title="/>

Club career
Murillo signed for the WPSL team Motor City FC in April 2016.

In August 2017, Murillo signed for Lithuanian club Gintra Universitetas and competed in UEFA Women's Champions League. She later signed to the Chicago Red Stars in the NWSL before officially retiring in 2019.

Personal life
Murillo's fiance is Richard Sánchez, also a footballer who, like her, was born in the United States, but has represented Mexico internationally. He currently plays for LA Galaxy. Murillo currently works for Chicago Fire FC.

References

External links

 Profile  at Mexican Football Federation
 
University of Michigan player profile
 

1993 births
Living people
Citizens of Mexico through descent
Mexican women's footballers
Women's association football central defenders
Mexico women's international footballers
2015 FIFA Women's World Cup players
Pan American Games bronze medalists for Mexico
Pan American Games medalists in football
Footballers at the 2015 Pan American Games
Gintra Universitetas players
Mexican expatriate women's footballers
Mexican expatriate sportspeople in Lithuania
Expatriate women's footballers in Lithuania
American women's soccer players
Soccer players from California
Sportspeople from Ventura County, California
American sportspeople of Mexican descent

Michigan Wolverines women's soccer players
American expatriate women's soccer players
American expatriate sportspeople in Lithuania
Medalists at the 2015 Pan American Games
Chicago Fire FC non-playing staff